A list of adventure films released in the 1920s.

1920

1921

1922

1923

1924

1925

1926

1927

1928

1929

References

1920s adventure films
1920s
Lists of 1920s films by genre